"Soul Revival" is a song by Australian rock group, Johnny Diesel and the Injectors. The song was released as the band's second single from their debut album Johnny Diesel and the Injectors in February 1989 and peaked at 9 in Australia. A limited edition picture disc was released in May.

Track listing
 7" Single
 "Soul Revival" - 4:05
 "Who's For Better" - 3:32

 12" / Vinyl 
 "Soul Revival" - 4:05
 "Who's For Better" - 3:32
 "Thang 1" - 6:11

 12" (picture disc) 
 "Soul Revival" 
 "Burn" (Live)	
 "Rat Pack" (Live)	
 "Parisienne Hotel" (Live)
Live tracks recorded for the Radio 1 Friday Rock Show on 14 April 1989.

Charts
"Soul Revival" debuted at #19 in Australia in February 1989, before peaking at #9 in March.

Weekly charts

Year-end charts

Credits
 Producer, Engineer, Mixed By – Terry Manning
 Bass – Johnny "Tatt" Dalzell
 Drums, Guitar – Yak Sherrit
 Guitar, Vocals – Johnny Diesel
 Saxophone, Backing Vocals – Bernie Bremond

External links

References

Chrysalis Records singles
1989 singles
1988 songs
Diesel (musician) songs
Songs written by Diesel (musician)
Song recordings produced by Terry Manning